Eram District is in Dashtestan County, Bushehr province, Iran. At the 2006 census, its population was 14,551 in 2,951 households. The following census in 2011 counted 13,375 people in 3,218 households. At the latest census in 2016, the district had 13,659 inhabitants living in 3,728 households.

References 

Districts of Bushehr Province
Populated places in Dashtestan County